The Gift of Love is a 1958 American CinemaScope drama romance film directed by Jean Negulesco and starring Lauren Bacall and Robert Stack.

The film's screenplay was based on the short story "The Little Horse" by Nelia Gardner White, originally published in a 1944 issue of Good Housekeeping, and previously made into the film Sentimental Journey (1946), with John Payne and Maureen O'Hara.

Plot
A brilliant scientist, Bill Beck (Stack), ends up happily married to Julie (Lauren Bacall), his doctor's receptionist. Five years after their wedding, the same doctor treats Julie for a heart condition that she decides to keep secret from her husband, who is doing serious work as a physicist developing guided missiles.

Not wishing him to be left alone if she dies, Julie suggests they adopt a child. An orphan called Hitty (Evelyn Rudie) has been rejected many times, but Julie takes a shine to her. Bill, a pragmatist, does not understand the little girl's fantasy world, and he is angered when Hitty, meaning well, erases a chalkboard, wiping out hours of Bill's hard work.

Bill's superior at work, Grant Allan (Lorne Greene), urges him to give the girl more patience and time, but the Becks believe it could be best that Hitty be returned to the orphanage. Julie's heart gives out. After her death, Hitty tries to win over her heartbroken foster father, but Bill is inconsolable.

Hitty is returned to the orphanage. She goes missing one night and is caught in a storm. Bill and Grant hurry there to assist in a search, and when they find Hitty and save her, Bill realizes he never wants to be apart from her again.

Cast
 Lauren Bacall as Julie Beck
 Robert Stack as William "Bill" Beck
 Evelyn Rudie as Hitty
 Lorne Greene as Grant Allan
 Anne Seymour as Miss McMasters
 Edward Platt as Dr. Jim Miller
 Joseph Kearns as Mr. Rynicker

See also
 List of American films of 1958

References

External links
 
 
 
 

1958 films
1958 romantic drama films
20th Century Fox films
Remakes of American films
American romantic drama films
Films about adoption
Films based on short fiction
Films directed by Jean Negulesco
Films produced by Charles Brackett
Films scored by Cyril J. Mockridge
Films scored by Alfred Newman
CinemaScope films
1950s English-language films
1950s American films